William Conrad Jordan (June 25, 1898 – July 13, 1968) was an American rower, born in Cleveland, Ohio, who competed in the 1920 Summer Olympics.

In 1920, he was part of the American boat from the United States Naval Academy (USNA), which won the gold medal in the men's eight. He graduated from USNA in 1922.

References

External links
 
 
 

1898 births
1968 deaths
Sportspeople from Cleveland
Rowers at the 1920 Summer Olympics
Olympic gold medalists for the United States in rowing
American male rowers
Medalists at the 1920 Summer Olympics